Muhammad Huzair Awan (Urdu: محمد ہزیر اعوان; born: 5 June 2006, also known as Cyber Kid) is a Pakistani Information Technology (IT) prodigy and public speaker. In 2013, he became the youngest Microsoft Certified Professional (MCP) at the age of seven, after Arfa Karim Randhawa who achieved this title at the age of nine. He became the youngest International Computer Driving License Certified (ICDL) in 2014 at the age of eight. He is keeping this title till now. He has received the Chief Minister's National Icon Award in 2014. He has also received the Dr. A.Q. Khan Gold Medal for Achievements in I.T. in 2015.  He is the Brand Ambassador of IEEE-Pakistan since 2014. In 2019, he has been included in the UNICEF Adolescent Champion Project 
He is developing his skills in multiple programming languages i.e. Python, C++, C-sharp, .Net framework, JAVA SCRIPT, CSS, R. Currently, he is working on various robotics projects such as
 
Shake hand robot 
Hand gesture control device
Car tracker
Driver-less car
Home automation

References

2006 births
Living people
21st-century Pakistani people
Hashemite people
Alids
Awan
Alvis